Bast is a fictional character appearing in American comic books published by Marvel Comics. The character first appeared as idol in  Fantastic Four #52 (cover-dated July 1966), created by Stan Lee and Jack Kirby, and is based on the Egyptian cat goddess Bastet. Bast is a member of the Heliopolitan and Wakandan pantheons. and the patron of the superhero Black Panther.

Bast appears in the live-action Marvel Cinematic Universe (MCU) film Black Panther (2018) and was interpreted by Akosia Sabet in Thor: Love and Thunder (2022).

Publication history 
Bast or Bastet is an ancient Egyptian goddess represented as a black cat. Bast first appeared in Marvel comics alongside Black Panther in Fantastic Four #52 as an idol.

In Avengers #87 (April 1971), written by Roy Thomas and illustrated by Sal Buscema, he is referred to as a male deity, the Panther-God. In Black Panther vol. 1 #7 (cover-dated January 1978), written and illustrated  by Jack Kirby, the first Black Panther, Olumo Bashenga, is said to have instituted the Panther cult. In the four issue Black Panther miniseries (1988), written by Peter B. Gillis and illustrated by Denys Cowan, he is referred to as Panther spirit. In Black Panther vol. 3 #21 (cover-dated August 2000) written by Christopher Priest and illustrated by Sal Velutto the Panther-God of Wakanda was retconned as Bast. In Black Panther vol. 6  #13 (cover-date June 2017) written by Ta-Nehisi Coates and illustrated by Wilfredo Torres it is revealed that Bast is part of the Wakandan pantheon, called The Orisha, also composed of gods from various places in Africa: Thoth and Ptah, as Bast are from Egypt, Mujaji from South Africa and Kokou is a war deity of Benin. Orisha is a Yoruba word meaning spirit or deity, previously revealed that Yoruba was one of the official languages of Wakanda. At first, the authors portrayed Bast as a male deity, but today they portray him as his analogue in Egyptian mythology.

Fictional character biography 

Bast the Panther Goddess is one of the eldest of the Ennead and the primary deity of Wakanda.  The daughter of the powerful Egyptian sun god Atum / Ra, Bast inherited her father's life-giving heat while her sister, the lion goddess Sekhmet, inherited his fiery, destructive fury. Bast was worshipped on Earth as early as 10,000 BC, granting power to her worshippers "the Children of Bast" and their descendants in the mountaintop city of Bastet, the High Kingdom.

After Egypt's mortal pharaohs rose to power, Bast began to obtain worshippers in the area that would one day become Wakanda as the "Panther God." Her sister Sekhmet arrived later and came to be worshipped in Wakanda as the "Lion God." 

Before the emergence of the Wakandan nation, mystic beings known as Originators were expelled from the region by the humans and the Orisha, the pantheon of Wakanda consisting of Thoth, Ptah, Mujaji, Kokou and Bast. Her other sister, K'Liluna, considered a betrayer, was banished from the pantheon. Bast also battled against another god, Magba.

In the distant past, a massive meteorite made up of the element vibranium crashed in Wakanda. The meteorite was named Mena Ngai. After the vibranium meteor fell, a number of Wakandans were painfully mutated into "demon spirits" and began attacking their fellow Wakandans. According to legends, during the tumult, T'Challa's ancestor Bashenga composed of various warring clans, he gathered all the aforementioned under his guide to defeating the inhabitants transformed by the impact into fierce "demonic spirits", a company which has unified the nation by founding Wakanda and becoming its first ruler and the first to obtain the title of "Black Panther" as it tells of his "spiritual connection" with the Panther Goddess Bast that led to the foundation of the Panther cult.

In other media

Films

Marvel Cinematic Universe 
The gods Bast and Sekhmet were both mentioned by T'Challa / Black Panther in the 2016 Marvel Cinematic Universe film Captain America: Civil War, with T'Challa explaining, "In my culture, death is not the end. It's more of a stepping-off point. You reach out with both hands, and Bast and Sekhmet, they lead you into the green veld where you can run forever." Bast is again mentioned in the prologue of the 2018 film Black Panther as having helped the first Black Panther become king of Wakanda. In the film Thor: Love and Thunder (2022), Bast is part of the Council of Godheads and was interpreted as a black woman, played by actress Akosia Sabet.

References

External links
 
 
 
 Bast at Comic Vine

Bastet
Black Panther (Marvel Comics) characters
Characters created by Jack Kirby
Characters created by Stan Lee
Comics characters introduced in 1966
Marvel Comics characters with superhuman strength
Marvel Comics deities
Marvel Comics female characters